Prądnik may refer to:

Cuisine
Prądnik bread

Rivers 
 Prądnik (river), Lesser Poland Voivodeship, Poland

Places

Villages
 Prądnik, West Pomeranian Voivodeship, a village in Poland
 Prądnik Korzkiewski, a village in the Lesser Poland Voivodeship, Poland

Boroughs of Kraków 
 Prądnik Biały, the III borough of Kraków and an eponymous neighbourhood
 Prądnik Czerwony, the IV borough of Kraków and an eponymous neighbourhood

See also 
 Prądniczanka, a Kraków-based sports club